This is a list of serving Admirals of the Indian Navy.

Chief of the Naval Staff 
The Chief of the Naval Staff is the only serving Four Star Admiral in the Indian Navy.

Vice Chief of the Naval Staff

Naval Commanders (Commander-in-Chief grade) 

*Rotational Command.

Principal Staff Officers (PSO)

Flag Officers of Tri-Services Commands

Directors General and Controllers

Chiefs of Staff of Naval Commands

Commandants of Training Institutions

Flag Officers Commanding Fleets

Flag officers Commanding Naval Areas

Admiral Superintendents Naval Dockyards

Other Flag Officers

See also
List of serving generals of the Indian Army
List of serving air marshals of the Indian Air Force

References

External links 

Lists of Indian military personnel

Indian military appointments
Indian Navy appointments
Indian Navy